Santolina is a genus of plants in the chamomile tribe within the sunflower family, primarily from the western Mediterranean region.

The leaves are simple and minute in some species, or pinnate, finely divided in other species, often densely silvery hairy, and usually aromatic. There are no ray florets.

Santolina species are used as food plants by the larvae of some Lepidoptera species including Bucculatrix santolinella (feeds exclusively on S. chamaecyparissus) and the Coleophora case-bearers C. albicella (recorded on S. chamaecyparissus), C. involucrella (feeds exclusively on Santolina spp) and C. santolinella (feeds exclusively on S. chamaecyparissus).

SpeciesAltervista Flora Italiana, genere Santolina includes photos + distribution maps
 Santolina africana Jord. & Fourr. - Algeria, Morocco, Tunisia
 Santolina benthamiana Jord. & Fourr. - France, Spain
 Santolina canescens Lag. - Spain
 Santolina chamaecyparissus L. - from Spain to Ireland + Turkey
 Santolina corsica Jord. & Fourr. - Corsica
 Santolina decumbens Mill. - France, Spain
 Santolina ericoides Poir. - France, Spain
 Santolina impressa Hoffmanns. & Link - Portugal
 Santolina magonica (O.Bolòs, Molin. & P.Monts.) Romo - Balearic Islands, Spain
 Santolina melidensis (Rodr.Oubiña & S.Ortiz) Rodr.Oubiña & S.Ortiz - Spain
 Santolina neapolitana Jord. & Fourr. - Campania, Italy
 Santolina oblongifolia Boiss. - Spain
 Santolina pectinata Lag. - Algeria, Morocco, Spain
 Santolina pinnata Viv. - Tuscany, Italy
 Santolina rosmarinifolia L. - south western Europe
 Santolina semidentata Hoffmanns. & Link - Spain, Portugal
 Santolina tinctoria Molina - Chile
 Santolina villosa Mill. - Spain
 Santolina virens Mill. - France, Spain, UK, Germany, Abruzzo (Italy), Ukraine

formerly included
numerous species formerly regarded as members of Santolina but now judged better suited to other genera: Achillea Athanasia Anthemis Calea Cladanthus Helenium Isocarpha Lasiospermum Lonas Matricaria Oedera Porophyllum Salmea Tanacetum

References

External links
 
 
 Flora Europaea: Santolina

Anthemideae
Asteraceae genera